Barbara Lauwers (April 22, 1914 – August 16, 2009), later known as Barbara Lauwers Podoski, was a corporal in the Women's Army Corps (WAC) and a recipient of the Bronze Star after one of her operations led to the defection of 600 soldiers from behind Italian lines and the withdrawal of their support from the Germans. She was stationed at the Office of Strategic Services (OSS) Morale Operations (MO) headquarters in Rome, Italy.

Background
Barbara Lauwers was born Božena Hauserová in 1914 in Brno, then Austro-Hungarian Monarchy. She became a lawyer and just before the break out of war she also became a journalist. Lauwers got married and she and her husband moved to Belgian Congo in 1939 when events started to escalate in Europe. In 1941 they moved to United States. After the bombing of Pearl Harbor, her husband joined the army and she went to work at the Czech embassy in Washington, D.C. before joining the WAC herself. She was sent to Algeria and then Rome, Italy where she pursued her work at the Morale Ops. (MO) (PsyOps psychological warfare).

World War II Work
While in Rome, Corporal Lauwers assembled a team of German prisoners to work in counterintelligence and psychological warfare. The prisoners worked as “cobblers”— spies who create false passports, visas, diplomas and other documents. She conducted Operation Sauerkraut, which infiltrated enemy lines with teams of German prisoners that spread “black” propaganda regarding Hitler throughout occupied Italian towns.

Lauwers was part of many successful campaigns, but her most revered stint occurred by chance while overhearing a German prisoner talk about Czech and Slovak soldiers attached to their command. They had to do menial works around the camps. Lauwers sprung into action using Czech and Slovak typewriters available at the Vatican and created two leaflets – one in each language. The message she wrote was mass-produced and also broadcast across BBC. Her influence was taken seriously because within one week hundreds of them were crossing over to Allied lines, at least 600 showing the leaflets she produced. This operation was the reason that Corporal Lauwers was given the Bronze Star.

Corporal Lauwers also created the "League of Lonely War Women" or VEK in German. This mythical organization was to demoralize German troops by making them believe that the females in their lives back home were having casual relations with other soldiers. Eight faked field post letters in the German language were produced by the OSS in Italy with the total number of forged field post letters that were printed in Rome being indicated in an OSS production report. 287,000 copies were produced in the period between 15 July 1944 and the end of the war. The operation was so successful that The Washington Post was fooled and ran a story on 10 October 1944 entitled, “German soldiers on leave from the Italian front have only to pin an entwined heart on their lapel during furloughs home to find a girlfriend.” The newspaper got the story from a circular which had been captured on the Eighth Army front and was actually written by Lauwers and carried behind German lines by the Sauerkraut agents.

Propaganda
League of Lonely Hearts Letter (translated):

References

External links

1914 births
2009 deaths
Women's Army Corps soldiers
United States Army soldiers
Czechoslovak lawyers
20th-century American women lawyers
20th-century American lawyers
21st-century American women
Czechoslovak emigrants to the United States